Charmed: Season 9 is a comic book series that was published monthly between June 2010 and October 2012 by Zenescope Entertainment, which owns the publishing rights to the Charmed comic book series. Written by Paul Ruditis and Raven Gregory, the series is an officially licensed continuation of the popular television series of the same name, which ended its eight-year run in 2006. Charmed: Season 9 is set eighteen months after the events of the television show's final episode. The first issue was released on July 21, 2010 and made its premiere at San Diego Comic-Con International. The series concluded with the season finale issue, "The Power of 300", and was succeeded by the novel The War on Witches (2015), also written by Ruditis, and Season 10 (2014–2016).

The series narrative follows the Charmed Ones – sisters Piper and Phoebe Halliwell and Paige Matthews – the most powerful good witches in history who use their combined "Power of Three" to protect innocent lives from demonic beings. After being reunited with their late elder sister, Prue, who was killed less than a decade earlier, the four sisters vanquish the demon Rennek in order to safeguard the existence and secrecy of magic.

The series was generally well received. One volume made The New York Times Best Seller list in early 2011. Initially, only 12 issues were contracted by Zenescope but, due to the success of the first few issues, the contract was doubled to 24 issues. One story arc comprises between five and seven issues which are reprinted in graphic novel form. The first issue sold out of its initial 17,000 copies in the first three weeks, which prompted Zenescope to release a second printing in time for the release of Issue #2.

Plot

Arc One (Issues 1–5)
Set eighteen-months after "Forever Charmed", the sisters have each entered into motherhood free of demons. Piper has had a third child, a girl named Melinda and is planning on opening her own restaurant. Phoebe has had her first daughter, Prue, with Coop and is preparing to return to work. Paige has had twin girls with Henry, is working as a whitelighter, and is seen helping Leo at Magic School with his students. Two new warlocks named Neena and Hogan begin implementing a plan to revive one of the sisters' greatest foes. The first arc begins with Piper and Phoebe attending the funeral of Brittany, the first "innocent" they ever saved. Meanwhile, Paige visits her latest charge, a high school bully named Brent, a witch later targeted and murdered by Neena and Hogan. While searching the Book of Shadows for clues to Brittany's death, Phoebe receives a powerful premonition showing that every single innocent saved by the sisters over the past nine and a half years is in grave danger.

While Piper and Paige attempt to gather as much information about their past innocents' current whereabouts, Phoebe finds her empathy power has returned as she conducts the wedding of Romeo & Juliet. Piper and Paige arrive at the home of Tyler Michaels, a teenage firestarter whom they saved from The Source many years ago. They find him under attack from demons who want to revive The Source, following Neena and Hogan's plan. Paige then receives a new power: a force field called an orb shield. The Charmed Ones later gather at the manor where they realize that they must go back to fighting evil, but they are unaware that Neena and Hogan's plan has been successful. When The Source makes himself known to the sisters and attacks them outside the manor with a huge fireball, Piper attempts to attack him and discovers that she has a new power. This causes the street to melt and bind to The Source, causing him to get stuck. The sisters escape to Magic School. Gathering magic from all their supernatural allies and using it in tandem with the "Power of Three", The Charmed Ones effectively vanquish The Source once again.

Arc Two (Issues 6–12)
The second arc picks up with the one-shot, "Morality Bites...Back". In the issue, after Cal Greene begins dating her assistant Mika, Phoebe deals with the potential threat of the baseball player based on a premonition she received nearly 10 years ago. When her empathy powers advance, Phoebe learns that she uses her empath powers to murder Cal in the future by reflecting his emotions back onto him, causing his brain to overload. After Cal attacks her editor Elise, Phoebe fears she will fulfill her premonition. Instead, she confides her secret identity as a witch to Elise and together they use magic to scare Cal into a confession. Later in the arc, Piper learns that her daughter Melinda is half-whitelighter, despite Leo being mortal during her conception. New Elder Kyle Brody reveals that the previous Elders activated Leo's latent whitelighter genes in her, hoping to making a more powerful "Power of Three" with Melinda and her half-whitelighter brothers, Wyatt and Chris. Now that The Source has been vanquished by The Charmed Ones, Neena, who has killed Hogan, has taken control of the Underworld and sets her sights on taking control of the Upper Regions and home of The Elders.

In the eighth issue, "Oh, Henry", Paige rescues a baby from the womb of a dying and homeless teenage mother. She and Henry adopt the boy and name him Henry Jr. Later in the second arc, in an altercation with Neena, Piper is sent into an alternate dimension. While trying to rescue her, Phoebe and Paige discover that Neena is no ordinary warlock; she is the First Witch and has been waiting many millennia to enact revenge upon The Elders and Angels of Destiny for interfering with her life and lover. Meanwhile, Piper realizes she is not alone in her alternate world; she talks with an Angel of Destiny who informs her of Neena's origins. Piper also interacts with Cole Turner, who provides her with an escape from the alternate dimension. After Piper is reunited with her sisters, The Charmed Ones and the spirits of their ancestral line battle Neena and her demon army in the Upper Regions in an all-out war. With the help of the Angels of Destiny and Leo, who gains mysterious powers after picking up an artifact protected by The Elders, The Charmed Ones soothe Neena's anger and banish her to the alternate world where Piper was previously imprisoned. While there, she is reunited with her lost love for six months out of every year. Realizing that meddling with Neena's destiny nearly resulted in her destroying the world, the Angels of Destiny also undo the meddling The Elders performed on The Charmed Ones' children, promising that should a new "Power of Three" emerge, it will be natural and not through outside influence.

Arc Three (Issues 13–19)
The third arc begins with "Piper's Place" and features the grand opening of Piper's restaurant named "Halliwell's". This arc features the long-awaited return of Prue. After Penny and Patty task Cole with finding Prue's missing spirit in exchange for helping him find peace in the afterlife, he locates her in the form of a blonde-haired witch named Patience who resides in Salem, Massachusetts. When confronted by Cole about her true identity, Prue (as Patience) explains that she was never allowed to move on into the afterlife; the prophecy of the Charmed Ones kept her tied to her sisters. As long as Prue still had a connection to the Warren line, she would stop her sisters from realizing their full power. She had to go someplace to be alone and chose a quiet corner of the Astral Plane. She found a witch who was in a coma with no chance of recovery and took over her body. In order to not interfere with the new "Power of Three", Prue chose to stay away from her sisters and used her powers to protect innocents. She asks Cole to keep her secret. 

Paige later finds herself with a new charge, a telekinetic witch named Sarah who happens to be Patience's co-worker at a Salem tour house. Paige shows up looking for Sarah; however, Cole won't let her in the house. Despite his pleas, she orbs into the house, where she meets Patience (Prue) and the two touch, causing their powers to blast them apart. After recovering, Patience tells Paige that she is Prue. At first, Paige doesn't believe her, but they go to the manor where Prue, Piper, and Phoebe are finally reunited. Prue's presence causes the sisters' powers to go haywire because the Charmed prophecy never spoke of a "Power of Four". To diffuse the chaos, Paige volunteers to strip her powers so that Prue can rejoin her sisters in the "Power of Three". Cole steps in and informs Prue that the real reason she remained tied to the "Power of Three" and unable to move on in the afterlife was because she refused to truly let go of her destiny with her sisters. Realizing that her time as a Charmed One has passed, Prue strips herself of her Warren powers.  After removing her active powers, she keeps the basic powers that allow her to cast spells and brew potions. Prue later returns to Salem with Cole, who will help her train new witches to atone for his evil past.

Arc Four (Issues 20–24)
The fourth arc begins with "The Old Witcheroo". Due to the machinations of Rennek, all magical beings have been disempowered and all mortals have been granted the ability to use magic. Because her powers were stripped at the time, not only did Prue gain her powers back, but she also gained all of her sisters' powers. Over the next six months, Prue became extremely busy as she was considered the most powerful witch on Earth. Prue figures out how to give her sisters their powers back: if she continues using her powers, they will drain from her and gradually return to her sisters. Phoebe gives birth to a girl, Parker, in the Manor. She wishes Prue could have been there, and apologizes to Parker for bringing her into the world without her magic to protect her from it. Elise tells Piper that the magical situation is the biggest news story ever and that some think it could be the end of the world. She assures Phoebe that the world will right itself soon enough. They wonder what Rennek is up to, believing that he's somewhere mobilizing his forces and plotting against them. Meanwhile, he is lying pool-side on a hammock with two magical creatures pampering him. Prue returns to the manor after many months away, very tired from all her battles. Neither Darryl nor her sisters can recognize her (they see Patience, not Prue's soul). Prue tells her sisters that Rennek stole the Grimoire before implementing his plan.

Next, Phoebe has a premonition in which she sees Prue dying. Prue (who has had the same premonition) drives out the enemy but dies. She enters limbo again and meets Cole. He tells her that the entrances to the Upper Regions and the Underworld have been closed to everyone, magical or not. Cole says that the dead magical creatures in that dimension could tear a hole back to Earth, and wants Prue to do it because he has information that could help her sisters. Prue returns to the land of the living. The sisters learn there is another Nexus, The Nexus of the All. It is located in the desert and can resolve the current magical issues. During the battle with Rennek at the Nexus of the All, Prue grabs the Empyreal Sword out of the Grimoire, absorbing it into herself. She casts a spell that gives her ownership over both items and vanquishes Rennek. Prue (covered in various symbols and runes) casts another spell to reconnect the realms at that place and to erase all memories of the last six months. The Nexus of the All is now a complete replica of the Manor, and everyone goes inside. "Patience"'s body has now become Prue's for good. Because she absorbed the Sword and the Grimoire, she is now the conduit that holds the realms together. She is the caretaker of the connection and can never leave the Nexus. Cole is her messenger.

Publication

Issues
{| class="wikitable plainrowheaders" style="margin: auto; width: 100%"
|-
!! style="background-color:#554c99; color: #FFF; text-align: center;"|Issue inSeries
!! style="background-color:#554c99; color: #FFF; text-align: center;"|Issue inSeason
!! style="background-color:#554c99; color: #FFF; text-align: center;"|Title
!! style="background-color:#554c99; color: #FFF; text-align: center;"|Written by
!! style="background-color:#554c99; color: #FFF; text-align: center;"|Penciled by
!! style="background-color:#554c99; color: #FFF; text-align: center;"|Original Release Date
|-
! style="background-color: #554c99; " colspan="6"|Volume 1
|-

|-
! style="background-color: #F86A28; " colspan="6"|Volume 2
|-

|-
! style="background-color: #14A6A2; " colspan="6"|Volume 3
|-

|-
! style="background-color: #FF579B; " colspan="6"|Volume 4
|-

|}

Collected editions
The issues are collected into trade paperback by Zenescope Entertainment after each story arc is complete.

References

Charmed (TV series)
2010 comics debuts
Comics based on television series